Bucculatrix solidaginiella is a species of moth in the family Bucculatricidae. It is found in North America, where it has been recorded from Florida, Louisiana, Maine, Missouri, New Jersey, Mississippi and Ohio. It was described in 1963 by Annette Frances Braun.

The wingspan is 11-12.5 mm. The forewings are white, marked with pale ocherous to brownish ocherous. The hindwings are brownish ocherous.  Adults are on wing from April to August.

The larvae feed on Solidago species. They feed in the growing tips of young shoots of their host plant, destroying the terminal bud, but barely boring into the tip of the stem. Pupation takes place in a white cocoon.

References

Natural History Museum Lepidoptera generic names catalog

Bucculatricidae
Moths described in 1963
Moths of North America
Taxa named by Annette Frances Braun